Lubenec is a municipality and village in Louny District in the Ústí nad Labem Region of the Czech Republic. It has about 1,300 inhabitants.

Administrative parts
Villages of Dolní Záhoří, Drahonice, Horní Záhoří, Ležky, Libkovice, Libyně, Přibenice, Řepany and Vítkovice are administrative parts of Lubenec.

References

Villages in Louny District